Albert Matterstock (13 September 1911 – 29 June 1960) was a German film actor. He played the lead in the 1938 aviation film Target in the Clouds.

Selected filmography
 Land of Love (1937)
 Serenade (1937)
 Yvette (1938)
 All Lies (1938)
 Target in the Clouds (1938)
 Who's Kissing Madeleine? (1939)
 Our Miss Doctor (1940)
 What Does Brigitte Want? (1941)
 Much Ado About Nixi (1942)
 A Waltz with You (1943)
 Come Back to Me (1944)
 Ghost in the Castle (1947)
 The Woman from Last Night (1950)
 Closed Exit (1955)
 Three Birch Trees on the Heath (1956)

References

External links

Bibliography 
 Paris, Michael. From the Wright Brothers to Top Gun: Aviation, Nationalism, and Popular Cinema. Manchester University Press, 1995.

1911 births
1960 deaths
German male film actors
Actors from Leipzig
20th-century German male actors